Pallavaram railway station is one of the railway stations of the Chennai Beach–Chengelpet section of the Chennai Suburban Railway Network. It serves the neighbourhood of Pallavaram, Pammal, Nagalkeni, Anakaputhur, Pozhichalur, Cowl Bazaar, Kolapakkam, Gerugambakkam, Kovoor, Thandalam, Tharapakkam, Thiruneermalai, Kundrathur, Mangadu, and Keelkattalai.

History

Pallavaram railway station lies on the Chennai Beach–Tambaram suburban section of the Chennai Suburban Railway, which was opened to traffic on 11 May 1931. The tracks were electrified on 15 November 1931. The section was converted to 25 kV AC traction on 15 January 1967.

Pallavaram Railway Station is one of the terminal for Southern Line of Chennai Suburban Railway Network next to Tambaram Railway Station and Chengalpattu Railway Station. During Meter Gauge several years back, Eight Peak Hour Services between Chennai Beach and Pallavaram Railway Station has been operated. Later, the services were removed after conversion to Broad Gauge.

Facilities
Pallavaram Railway Station is one of the busiest station after Tambaram, Guindy, Mambalam and Egmore in the Chennai Beach–Tambaram section.

The station is closer to Pallavaram Bus Terminus on the Grand Southern Trunk Road. The station's proximity to Friday Market and Chennai Airport also makes it one of the important station.

Currently, single special train is being operated between Chennai Beach and Pallavaram on morning session during peak hour.

RailWire WiFi services are available at the station.

Mini bus services are available from the eastern side of the station to Keelkattalai, Tirusulam Sakthi Nagar.

Double discharge platforms are available on the western side of the station.

All the level crossings are upgraded as Railway Over Bridges and Railway Under Bridges.

See also

 Chennai Suburban Railway
 Railway stations in Chennai

References

External links
Pallavaram railway station at Indiarailinfo.org

Stations of Chennai Suburban Railway
Railway stations in Chennai
Railway stations in Kanchipuram district